The Hyatt Regency Rochester is a Hyatt hotel located in Rochester, New York.

See also

List of tallest buildings in Rochester, New York

References

External links
Rochester Hyatt website

Skyscrapers in Rochester, New York
Hyatt Hotels and Resorts
Skyscraper hotels in New York (state)
Hotel buildings completed in 1990